Kawakaze (江風, Inlet Wind) was the lead ship of her class of two destroyers built for the Imperial Japanese Navy (IJN) during World War I.

Design and description
The Kawakaze-class destroyers were enlarged and faster versions of the preceding  with a more powerful armament. Kawakaze was powered by two Parsons geared steam turbines, each driving one shaft using steam produced by four Type Ro Kampon water-tube boilers. Their crew consisted of 128 officers and ratings.

The main armament of the Kawakaze-class ships consisted of three quick-firing (QF)  guns; one gun each was located at the bow and stern with the third gun positioned abaft the bridge on the forecastle deck. Their torpedo armament consisted of three twin rotating mounts for  torpedoes; two mounts were located between the stern gun and the funnels while the third mount was placed between the forward funnel and the forecastle. The ships were later rearmed with two triple-tube mounts in lieu of their twin mounts.

Construction and career
Kawakaze was launched on 10 October 1917 at the Yokosuka Naval Arsenal and completed on 11 November 1918. She was decommissioned on 1 April 1934 and subsequently broken up.

References

Bibliography

1917 ships
Ships built by Yokosuka Naval Arsenal
Kawakaze-class destroyers